The Sri Lanka Police Vishishta Seva Padakkama ("Sri Lanka Police Distinguished Service Medal") is awarded to senior police officers in Sri Lanka for Meritorious Performance of Police duties. It is similar to the Vishista Seva Vibhushanaya of the Sri Lanka Armed Forces. The medal replaced the Ceylon Police Medal for Meritorious Service which was awarded until Ceylon became a Republic in 1972.

See also
 Awards and decorations of the Sri Lanka Police
 Vishista Seva Vibhushanaya

References

External links
Sri Lanka Police

Civil awards and decorations of Sri Lanka
Law enforcement awards and honors
Awards established in 1982
1982 establishments in Sri Lanka